Manikavasagam s/o Sundram (Tamil:  சு. மாணிக்கவாசகம்) (born 27 June 1965) is a Malaysian politician and social activist. He is a member of Parti Rakyat Malaysia (PRM). Manikavasagam Sundram was the Member of the Parliament of Malaysia for the Kapar constituency in Selangor from 2008 to 2013, as a member of the People's Justice Party (PKR) in the Pakatan Harapan (PH) opposition coalition.

Manikavasagam was elected to Parliament in the 2008 election, winning the seat of Kapar, previously held by the Barisan Nasional (BN) coalition. Before his election, Manikavasagam was a prominent leader in the Hindu Rights Action Force (HINDRAF).

In December 2008, Manikavasagam announced he would leave PKR, citing disappointment with the party's leadership in Selangor. He eventually resigned from a leadership position within PKR, but not from the party itself.

In June 2009, an arrest warrant was issued for Manikavasagam after he allegedly refused to respond to a subpoena to testify at an inquest into the death of an actress. Manikavasagam applied to have the warrant set aside, and eventually testified at the inquest. Less than two weeks later, he was arrested over an unrelated public demonstration.

PKR did not renominate Manikavasagam to defend his Kapar parliamentary seat in the 2013 election. He contested the Selangor State Legislative Assembly seat of Bukit Melawati instead, losing to a United Malays National Organisation (UMNO) candidate. In 2014 he was suspended from PKR for making allegations of "money politics" against the Selangor Chief Minister Khalid Ibrahim. After the lifting of his suspension, he challenged Khalid for the leadership for the Selangor division of PKR, and won, part of a series of events culminating in Khalid's downfall as Chief Minister later in the year.

On 7 April 2018, he announced that he has rejoined Parti Rakyat Malaysia (PRM), a party which he first joined in 1999 before leaving for PKR in 2000.  He also contested for the Kapar parliamentary seat and Meru state seat in the 2018 election under PRM ticket but lost both.

Election results

References

1965 births
Living people
People from Selangor
Malaysian politicians of Indian descent
Malaysian politicians of Tamil descent
Parti Rakyat Malaysia politicians
Former People's Justice Party (Malaysia) politicians
Members of the Dewan Rakyat
21st-century Malaysian politicians